Chelevand Rural District is a rural district (dehestan) in Lavandevil District, Astara County, Gilan Province, Iran. At the 2006 census, its population was 7,553, in 1,735 families. The rural district has 13 villages.

References 

Rural Districts of Gilan Province
Astara County